Fibersat is a communications satellite operator in Africa, and the Middle East, headquartered in Luxembourg.  Fibersat intends to launch its first satellite Fibersat-1 in 2018.

History 
Fibersat was established in 2013 by Yen Choi and Christof Kern.  In 2015, Fibersat announced a hosted payload agreement with Arabsat on one of the upcoming launches.  Fibersat has fully funded its first hosted payload and has signed multiyear contracts of up to 10 years in duration.

Coverage 
Fibersat-1 intends to provide coverage across Africa and the Middle East.

Services 
Direct to Home Broadcasting
Broadband
Satellite Internet
VOIP
Unmanned Aerial Vehicle
Aviation
4G/LTE

Fleet 

Upcoming

Fibersat-1 
Fibersat 1 is a Ka-band High Throughput Satellite (HTS) with multiple spot beams across Africa and the Middle East.  The target launch date is Q3, 2018.

References 

Communications satellite operators